Battus is a New World genus of butterflies that are usually found around pipevine (genus Aristolochia) plants. The caterpillars feed off the poisonous pipevines, making the insects poisonous themselves; they taste very bad to ward off predators. Since birds avoid these butterflies, other swallowtail species mimic their coloration. The common North American species are Battus polydamas and Battus philenor.

Etymology 
In Greek mythology, Battus is a shepherd who witnessed Hermes stealing Apollo's cattle. Because he broke his promise not to reveal this theft, Hermes turned him to stone.

Species 
Listed alphabetically within groups:

subgenus: Battuosa Möhn, 1999
species group: belus Möhn, 1999
 Battus belus (Cramer, 1777) – Belus swallowtail
 Battus crassus (Cramer, 1777) – Crassus swallowtail
 Battus eracon (Godman & Salvin, 1897) – west-Mexican swallowtail, Colima swallowtail
 Battus ingenuus (Dyar, 1907) – Dyar's swallowtail, confused swallowtail
 Battus laodamas (C. & R. Felder, 1859) – green-patch swallowtail, yellow-spotted swallowtail
 Battus lycidas (Cramer, [1777]) – Cramer's swallowtail, yellow-trailed swallowtail
 Battus polystictus (Butler, 1874)

species group: madyes Möhn, 1999
 Battus madyes (Doubleday, 1846) – Madyes swallowtail

subgenus: Battus Möhn, 1999
species group: philenor
 Battus devilliersii (Godart, 1823)
 Battus philenor (Linnaeus, 1771) – pipevine swallowtail
 Battus zetides (Munroe, 1971) – Zetides swallowtail

species group: polydamus Möhn, 1999
 Battus polydamas (Linnaeus, 1758) – Polydamas swallowtail, gold rim swallowtail, or tailless swallowtail

References

Edwin Möhn, 2002 Schmetterlinge der Erde, Butterflies of the World Part V (5), Papilionidae II: Battus. Edited by Erich Bauer and Thomas Frankenbach Keltern: Goecke & Evers; Canterbury: Hillside Books.   Illustrates and identifies 14 species and 49 subspecies.

External links

Battus , Insects Online
Battus, BugGuide
Battus Butterflies of America. Mostly types.

 
Papilionidae
Butterfly genera
Taxa named by Giovanni Antonio Scopoli